Kajsa Arwefjäll (born 20 June 2000) is a Swedish amateur golfer and former world champion rope skipper.

Early life and family
Arwefjäll was born in Tranås in 2000 and moved with her family to Höllviken in 2009, where she grew up playing at Ljunghusen Golf Club. Raised in an athletic family, her mother is an accomplished skier and her father, a former professional golfer, is her coach. Her brother Kasper plays ice-hockey with the Malmö Redhawks. She is a former world champion rope skipper with 21 national and international medals.

Amateur career
Arwefjäll won her first international title in the 2018 Irish Girls U18 Open Stroke Play Championship at Roganstown Golf & Country Club, where she overcame a three-stroke deficit to win by one shot ahead of Louise Rydqvist.

Drafted to the National Team, she competed at the 2018 European Girls' Team Championship and the 2018 Junior Golf World Cup in Japan, where she won a bronze medal together with Andrea Lignell and Ingrid Lindblad. In 2021, she helped Sweden place third at The Spirit International Amateur Golf Championship.

Arwefjäll graduated from Sundsgymnasiet in 2019 and accepted an athletic scholarship to San Jose State University, and she started playing with the San Jose State Spartans women's golf team. As a sophomore, she was an individual qualifier to the NCAA Championships where she tied for 36th.

Arwefjäll was runner-up at the 2020 Johannesberg Ladies Open and at the 2021 Swedish Junior Strokeplay Championship. With her father on the bag she won the 2021 GolfUppsala Open on the LET Access Series, where she beat Sofie Bringner on the second hole of a playoff.

Amateur wins
2016 Skandia Tour Riks #6
2017 Buschnell Ljunghusen Open, Skandia Tour Future #5
2018 Irish Girls U18 Open Stroke Play Championship, Teen Tour Future #4, Teen Tour Elite #6
2019 Schyberg Junior Open

Source:

Professional wins (1)

LET Access Series (1)

^Co-sanctioned with the Swedish Golf Tour

Swedish Golf Tour (1)
2021 GolfUppsala Open^
^Co-sanctioned with the LET Access Series

Team appearances
Amateur
European Girls' Team Championship (representing Sweden): 2018
Toyota Junior Golf World Cup (representing Sweden): 2018
The Spirit International Amateur Golf Championship (representing Sweden): 2021
Arnold Palmer Cup (representing the International Team): 2022 (winners)
European Ladies' Team Championship (representing Sweden): 2022

References

External links

Swedish female golfers
Amateur golfers
San Jose State Spartans women's golfers
Sportspeople from Skåne County
People from Vellinge Municipality
2000 births
Living people
21st-century Swedish women